Penicillium lapidosum is an anamorph species of the genus of Penicillium which produces patulin.

Further reading

References 

lapidosum
Fungi described in 1948